The LSU Lady Tigers cross country program represents Louisiana State University in the sport of women's cross country running. The program competes in National Collegiate Athletic Association (NCAA) Division I and the Southeastern Conference (SEC).

Coaching staff 
Dennis Shaver is the head coach for the LSU Lady Tigers cross country and track and field program; Khadevis Robinson is the assistant coach who is responsible for the day-to-day oversight of the men's and women's cross country teams.

Facilities

Highland Road Park
Highland Road Park is the site of home cross country meets for the LSU Lady Tigers cross country team. The course is located in the 144.04 acre park.

Bernie Moore Track Stadium weight room
Opened in January 2003, the weight room is for the LSU Lady Tigers cross country and LSU Tigers cross country team's. The LSU track and field weight room is a 2,000 square foot facility designed for an Olympic style lifting program. Located adjacent to the track, the weight room features 10 multi-purpose power stations, 5 dumbbell stations, 4 power racks, 5 sets of competition plates, 10 competition Olympic bars, 2 multi-purpose racks, an assortment of selectorized machines and 2 televisions for multimedia presentations.

See also 
LSU Tigers track and field
LSU Tigers and Lady Tigers

References

External links